André Andrade may refer to:

 André Andrade (athlete), Brazilian paralympic athlete
 André Andrade (footballer) (born 1976), Brazilian footballer

See also
Andrés Andrade (disambiguation)